WPTB (850 AM) is a radio station broadcasting a top 40 radio format. Licensed to Statesboro, Georgia, United States, the station is currently owned by Neal Ardman, through licensee Radio Statesboro, Inc.

History
The station went on the air as WPTB on 1976-04-05. On 2004-05-17, the station changed its call sign to WMCD.  On 2004-07-08, the station changed its call sign back to the original WPTB.

References

External links

PTB
Contemporary hit radio stations in the United States